Munmorah was an electoral district of the Legislative Assembly in the Australian State of New South Wales, which partly replaced Wyong in 1973. It was named after Lake Munmorah or the locality of the same name. In 1981, it was replaced by Swansea and Tuggerah. Its only member was Harry Jensen, representing the Labor Party.

Members for Munmorah

Election results

References

Munmorah
1973 establishments in Australia
Constituencies established in 1973
1981 disestablishments in Australia
Constituencies disestablished in 1981